Zürich Tiefenbrunnen railway station is a railway station in the Swiss city of Zürich. It is located on the Lake Zürich right bank railway line, and is situated on the shore of Lake Zürich, in the Seefeld quarter of the city.

Operation
The station has one side platform and one island platform, served by three tracks, and the station building and entrance is on the west or lake side of the station. The platforms and entrances are connected by pedestrian subway.

The station is served by the following passenger trains:

Adjacent to the station is the terminus of tram routes 2 and 4 and trolleybus route 33, all operated by Verkehrsbetriebe Zürich, the municipal transport operator for Zürich. The station is also served by regional bus routes of the Autobusbetrieb Zürich–Zollikon–Küsnacht (AZZK).

The steamer pier is served by boats of the Zürichsee-Schifffahrtsgesellschaft on both its Lake Zurich and River Limmat services.

Gallery

References

External links 

Passenger information on Zürich Tiefenbrunnen railway station from the SBB

Swiss Federal Railways stations
Tiefenbrunnen
District 8 of Zürich